Wrong Turn 3: Left for Dead is a 2009 slasher film directed by Declan O'Brien and starring Tom Frederic, Janet Montgomery, and Tamer Hassan. It is a sequel to Wrong Turn 2: Dead End (2007) and the third installment in the Wrong Turn film series. The film grossed $5.9 million in home sales.

The film was released on October 20, 2009, and followed by a prequel, Wrong Turn 4: Bloody Beginnings (2011).

Plot

Four college students – Alex, Brent, Sophie and Trey – go to the West Virginia backcountry on a rafting trip. As they are camping by the riverside, the inbred cannibal Three Finger appears and murders the teens except Alex, who escapes after witnessing her friends' deaths.

Two days later, three prison guards: Nate Wilson, Walter and Preslow are assigned, along with undercover prisoner and U.S. Marshal William "Willy" Juarez, to oversee the transportation of Carlo Chavez, a leader of a crime organization, to a distant prison in Hazleton with three other prisoners: Floyd, a neo-Nazi serial killer; Crawford, a car thief, and Brandon, a former U.S. Marine. En route, they take the road to the abandoned paper mill through Greenbrier County when their bus tires are tangled with barbed wire from Three Finger's truck and crashes into the woods, forcing them to continue on foot as Three Finger attacks them from the distance and kills Preslow. Nate and Walter are now held hostage by the prisoners when they find Alex, who was hiding out in the woods from Three Finger and his nephew Three Toes. As they follow her, they find an abandoned armored truck containing bags of money. Nate finds a gun in the truck and gives it to Walter who uses it to shoot Chavez but the weapon is not loaded, and the latter kills Walter in retaliation. Chavez forces those left alive to carry the money and walk to the campsite so the criminals can use the rafts for their escape with the loot. Along the trail, they stumble upon a trap set by Three Toes that they are able to evade. Chavez and Floyd subdue the young cannibal and behead him, leaving a trophy on the spent booby trap for Three Finger to find as a deterrent. After Nate disrupts the prisoners' escape to the river, Chavez unwittingly releases a trap set by Three Finger that kills Willy. The prisoners find Three Finger's truck and when Crawford attempts to hijack the vehicle, he is lured into another trap by Three Finger who ensnares him with a netting of razor wire and drives off, dragging him down the road.

Local town Sheriff Calvin Carver discovers the crashed prison bus and contacts the U.S. Marshal team while he looks for Nate's group along with his deputy Ally Lane. Nate and Alex, with Brandon's help by distracting Floyd to attack Chavez, attempt to escape but the latter recaptures the two after beating down Floyd and leaving him behind. After they find the location where the watch tower once stood that was burned down years ago, Carver finds the group but he is killed by Three Finger. When Chavez attempts to reclaim the money, Floyd takes the bags as Chavez chases after him only to see Three Finger lobbing a molotov cocktail at Floyd, killing him and burning all the money. Now enraged at the mutant cannibal, Chavez tosses Alex to Three Finger to improve his chances of survival and she is taken captive. Infuriating the others by his actions, Chavez is knocked unconscious by Brandon allowing Nate to go back and rescue Alex. Chavez is then killed by Three Finger after the mutant overpowers him during their fight.

Alex awakens in Three Finger's cabin and sees Deputy Lane dying from a razor wire net. Nate finds the cabin and frees Alex, but they are attacked by Three Finger as they escape. Three Finger chases after them as they drive away in his tow truck, causing them to crash into a tree. As the truck is about to explode, Brandon appears and pulls Alex out. While Brandon helps Nate, Three Finger attacks them but Nate manages to kill him by stabbing him in the head with his meat hook. After Nate releases Brandon in return for his help, the Marshal team arrives the next morning to rescue Nate and Alex.

Sometime later, Nate returns to the forest to take the remaining money from the armored truck but Brandon appears and kills him. As he takes the money, an unknown cannibal appears and kills Brandon.

Cast

 Tom Frederic as Officer Nate Wilson
 Janet Montgomery as Alex Miles
 Tom McKay as Brandon Lewis
 Tamer Hassan as Carlos Chavez
 Gil Kolirin as Floyd
 Jake Curran as Crawford
 Christian Contreras as U.S. Marshal William 'Willy' Juarez 
 Chucky Venn as Walter Hazelton
 Mike Straub as Preslow
 Borislav Iliev as Three Finger
 Borislav Petrov as Three Toes
 Bill Moody as Sheriff Calvin Carver
 Emma Clifford as Deputy Ally Lane
 Jack Gordon as Trey King
 Louise Cliffe as Sophie Delaney
 Charley Speed as Brent McDonald
 Mac McDonald as Warden Ladew
 Vlado Mihailov as U.S. Marshal Davis
 Todd Jensen as U.S. Marshal

Production
Shooting took place in Sofia, Bulgaria. The only returning character was Three Finger; however he was played by a different actor, the third in as many films.

Release
The film was released on DVD and Blu-ray on October 20, 2009. The film grossed $5.9 million in home sales.

Reception
All four of the reviews reported by Rotten Tomatoes are counted as towards negative. Bloody Disgusting said, "If WT2 raised the bar, then WT3 lowers it right back down to where it was, and possibly a notch or two lower."

References

External links
 
 

2009 films
2009 direct-to-video films
2009 horror films
2000s slasher films
20th Century Fox direct-to-video films
American sequel films
Films about cannibalism
American slasher films
Incest in film
American prison films
Films set in West Virginia
Films shot in Bulgaria
American splatter films
Constantin Film films
Summit Entertainment films
3
Direct-to-video horror films
Direct-to-video sequel films
Films directed by Declan O'Brien
2000s English-language films
2000s American films